Olmillos de Castro is a municipality located in the province of Zamora, Castile and León, Spain. According to the 2004 census (INE), the municipality had a population of 378 inhabitants.

Town hall
Olmillos de Castro is home to the town hall of 4 towns, because Olmillos is the central point between the 4 towns. The towns are the following:
San Martín de Tábara (72 inhabitants, INE 2020).
Olmillos de Castro (63 inhabitants, INE 2020).
Marquiz de Alba (59 inhabitants, INE 2020).
Navianos de Alba (18 inhabitants, INE 2020).

References

Municipalities of the Province of Zamora